Jacquelyn Frank is an author of paranormal romance novels.  Her novel Rapture reached number 8 in The New York Times paperback fiction chart.

Bibliography

The Nightwalkers
 Jacob (Zebra, 2006)
 Gideon (Zebra, 2007)
 Elijah (Zebra, 2007)
 Damien (Zebra, 2008)
 Noah (Zebra, 2008)
 Kane (Zebra, 2011, in Supernatural anthology)
 Adam (Zebra, 2011)

ShadowDwellers
 Ecstacy (Zebra, 2009)
 Rapture (Zebra, 2009)
 Pleasure (Zebra, 2009)

The Gatherers
 Hunting Julian (Zebra, 2010)
 Stealing Kathryn (Zebra, 2010)

The Three worlds
 Seduce me in Dreams (Ballantine Books, 2011)
 Seduce me in Flames (Ballantine Books, 2011)

The World of the Nightwalkers
 Forbidden (Ballantine Books, 2012)
 Forever (Ballantine Books, 2013)
 Forsaken (Ballantine Books, 2014)
 Forged (Ballantine Books2014)
 Nightwalker (Loveswept, 2015) (e-book only release)

Immortal Brothers
 Cursed by Fire (Ballantine Books, 2015)
 Cursed by Ice (Ballantine Books, 2015)
 Bound by sin (Ballantine Books, 2015)
 Bound in Darkness (Ballantine Books, 2015)

Kiss of Magic
 A Kiss of Magic (Self Published, 2016) (e-book)
 A Kiss of Fire (Self Published, 2016) (e-book)

Energy Vampires
 Thirst (Loveswept, 2017) (e-book)
 Hunger (Loveswept, 2017) (e-book)
 Famished (2018) (e-book)

Mine to Take
 Warlord (Changeling Press, 2018) (e-book)
 Conquest (Changeling Press, 2018) (e-book)
 Valerian (Changeling Press, 2018) (e-book)
 Melena (Changeling Press, 2018) (e-book)
 Truce (Changeling Press, 2018) (e-book)
 Victory (Changeling Press, 2018) (e-book)

Single Titles
 The Phoenix Project (Zebra, 2010 in Nocturnal anthology)
 Drink of Me (Zebra, 2010)
 Trusted (Self Published, 2016)

Writing as JAX
 The Bid (Aphrodisia, 2010)
 The Science of Pleasure (Aphrodisia, 2013 in The Pleasure Project anthology)
 Hunter (Zebra, 2014)
 Dangerous (Zebra, 2014)

References

External links
 Jacquelyn Frank official site

21st-century American novelists
American romantic fiction writers
Living people
American women novelists
21st-century American women writers
Women romantic fiction writers
Year of birth missing (living people)